Wasteland is the seventh studio album by Polish progressive rock band Riverside. The album was released on 28 September 2018, through InsideOut Music. The album reached number one in Poland and Sweden, the top 20 in Germany, and the top 40 in Austria, Finland, the Netherlands and Switzerland. It is the first album without founding guitarist Piotr Grudziński after his death on 21 February 2016.

Track listing

Personnel
Riverside
 Mariusz Duda – vocals, electric and acoustic guitars, bass, piccolo bass, banjo; guitar solo on "Lament" and "Wasteland"
 Piotr Kozieradzki – drums
 Michał Łapaj – keyboards and synthesizers, rhodes piano and Hammond organ; theremin on "Wasteland"

Guest personnel
 Maciej Meller – guitar solo on "Acid Rain", "Guardian Angel", "The Struggle for Survival" and "River Down Below"
 Michał Jelonek – violin on "The Day After", "Lament" and "Wasteland"
 Mateusz Owczarek – guitar solo on "Vale of Tears"

Charts

Certifications

References

2018 albums
Inside Out Music albums
Mystic Production albums
Riverside (band) albums